= Vehicle registration plates of Seychelles =

Republic of Seychelles
- Country: Seychelles
- Country code: SY
- Colour (front): White on black
- Colour (rear): White on black

Seychelles requires its residents to register their motor vehicles and display vehicle registration plates.

Image	First issued	Design	Serial format	Serials issued	Slogan	Notes
	the top one until 2018, the bottom one since 2018		A0000 AA/0000	A0000		
